John Canoe, also known as January Conny, (died circa 1725) was the European name given to an Akan warrior from Axim, Ghana. 
He was a chief of the Ahanta people in the early 18th  century, who established a stronghold in the defunct Fort Fredericksburg and fought multiple wars with European traders for twenty years. The stronghold finally fell in 1725, though Canoe's fate is unknown. He is commemorated in the Junkanoo festival held in the Caribbean each December.

History

Origin of John Canoe
January Conny (also named John Kenu, Johann Kuny, John Conrad, Johann Cuny, Jean Cunny, January Konny or John Conni by German, Dutch, British or French-language designation) was a powerful Gold Coast merchant. Conny had a private army and was an ally of Brandenburg-Prussia at the time of the Brandenburger Gold Coast colony (1683–1720) in Axim on the coast of present-day Ghana in West Africa. Between 25 December 1708 to 1724 he took over control of the abandoned Brandenburger fortress of Fort Fredericksburg and defended it against several massive conquest attempts of the Dutch. The history of the defence of the fortress was distorted for propaganda purposes in the 19th century by followers of a German colonial commitment and used for their own purposes. The tale of January Conny has today spread to different parts of the Caribbean and Ghana's Fancy Dress Festival, which was probably based on the story of January Conny.

The names listed above are European corruptions of a still unknown African name, though it can be safely assumed that "Kenu" was a part of it, as this is a typical Akan name. Jon Conny, chief of the Ahanta ethnic group, often referred to as "the King of Prinze Terre", as the Prussian's African broker, was a most effective ally, succeeding in directing such trade to the fort that revenues dwindled at the Dutch forts at Axim, Butre and Sekondi. More than 95 ships are recorded as having traded with Fort Fredericksburg between 1711 and 1713. In 1717, with their departure from the Gold Coast, Brandenburg sold its possessions to the Dutch, without John Conny's knowledge.

Despite this internal conflict he remained a middleman of the Brandenburgers and, with their support, led a two-year conflict against neighbouring Dutch and British bases. In the course of this war, he attacked the neighbouring British trading post Fort Metal Cross at Dixcove, which was seriously damaged. In the course of these events he was able not only to provide support for his private army (warriors of the Ashanti (Asante) and Wassa), but also was able to provide support to his local population of Ahanta people and the local brokers against the Dixcove traders and the Dutch base Butre recourse.

January Conny had a large number of muskets and cannons, with which he repelled several attacks by the Dutch. Supposedly he commanded at that time an army of 20,000 men. In 1724, after seven years of control of the fortress, he gave up and withdrew from the Brandenburger Gold Coast, defeated by the Fante troops led by an Asafo. After the capture of Prince's Town, John Kenu vanished into obscurity, possibly escaping to Kumasi, the capital of his Asante allies.

In addition, Jan Conny was one of the three or four large African traders of the 18th century in Ghana. Jan Conny, John Kabes and Thomas Ewusi and an unknown man in command of large private armies and wrapped as a national wholesaler a significant part of trade (and hence also of the slave trade) with the Europeans on the Gold Coast.

Creation of the John Canoe Festival

According to Edward Long, an 18th-century Jamaican slave owner/historian, the John Canoe festival was created in the Caribbean by those Akans who supported John Canoe in Fredericksburg and had subsequently been enslaved when it fell. The festival itself included motifs from battles typical of Akan fashion. The Ashanti swordsman became the "horned headed man"; the Ashanti commander became "Pitchy patchy" who also wears a battledress with what would resemble charms, referred to as a "Batakari".

See also
Junkanoo, the Bahamian and Turks and Caicos Islands spelling.
Afro-Jamaican
Coromantee, an archaic or out-dated term to mean Akan
Fancy Dress Festival also known as Kakamotobi
Kundum Festival an Ahanta masquerade dedicated to exorcism of "devils".

References

Further reading
  (Based on the author's thesis "Trade and Politics on the Gold Coast, 1640–1720", University of London)
 

 Malte Stamm, Das Koloniale Experiment. Der Sklavenhandel Brandenburg-Preußens im transatlantischen Raum 1680–1718. Univ.-Diss., Düsseldorf, 2013
 Emil Steurich: Johann Kuny, der erste brandenburgisch-preußische Negerfürst. Eine Erzählung aus den Kolonien des Großen Kurfürsten, München (1900)

External links

 
 

Jamaican culture
North Carolina culture
Cultural festivals in the Bahamas
Festivals in North Carolina
Folk festivals in the United States
Cultural festivals in Belize
Cultural festivals in Honduras
Cultural festivals in Jamaica
Cultural festivals in Barbados
Cultural festivals in Anguilla
Cultural festivals in the Cayman Islands
Cultural festivals in Montserrat
Cultural festivals in the Turks and Caicos Islands
Cultural festivals in Trinidad and Tobago